The F. Jacob Schmidt House is a historic building located in the West End of Davenport, Iowa, United States. F. Jacob Schmidt, who built this house, worked as a cooper. This Queen Anne style house was possibly ordered from a Victorian pattern book. It is a 1½-story structure with a projecting side pavilion. It's noteworthy feature is the sunburst pattern on the main gable. The Eastlake style porch has subsequently been replaced with one of a more simple design. The house has been listed on the National Register of Historic Places since 1983.

References

Houses completed in 1890
Queen Anne architecture in Iowa
Houses in Davenport, Iowa
Houses on the National Register of Historic Places in Iowa
National Register of Historic Places in Davenport, Iowa